Fatemeh Sadeghi (born 26 October 1946), better known by her stage name Jamileh (also romanized as Ġamīle), is an Iranian actress, cabaret performer, and dancer. She is responsible for popularizing a version of the belly dance in Iran, and was reportedly the highest-paid cabaret actor of Iranian origin in 1974. She has also performed acting and dancing roles in many Iranian films of the 1960s and 1970s.

Biography

Early life 
Jamileh was born in 1946 in Tehran, Iran. Her father, Rajab Vâksi, was a walnut seller who later became an actor in the siâh theater scene in Iran. Her uncle, Morshed Nasrollâh, was a zarb player and an itinerant bard. As a child, she became proficient in belly dancing and performed with her father.

Dancing career 

Jamileh was first involved in the theater scene and mostly performed a self-taught style of Bollywood dance in traditional cafés. Her first marriage was to J.R., a singer of the ruhowzi genre of musical comedy in traditional Persian theater. She then married Mohammad Arbâb, the owner of the Bakara-Mulan Ruzh cabaret. After marrying Arbâb, she continued dancing and performed in cabarets such as Arbâb's Bakara-Mulan Ruzh as well as in her own cabaret, Lidu. Her marriage to Arbâb lasted until his death in 1973.

Much like other Iranian entertainers of the 20th century such as Susan, Delkash, and Googoosh, Jamileh's career dancing in cabarets provided her the opportunity to enter Iranian cinema, which would eventually lead her to national fame. She began her acting career after her marriage to Arbâb, aiming to be recognized as a "dancer-actor" in Iranian cinema, like Samia Gamal in Egyptian cinema. She mainly played dance-related roles in more than 25 films, including roles in Zan-e Vahshi-e Vahshi (1969), Dokhtar-e Zalem Bala (1970), and Aroos-e Paberahneh (1974). Many of the films she starred in were produced by Ferdowsi Film, owned by her husband Arbâb, including the 1971 film Khoshgeltarin Zan-e Alam. She was reportedly the highest-paid cabaret actor of Iranian origin in 1974, and performed for prominent foreign guests including Henry Kissinger and Aristotle Onassis.

Career after Iran 
After fleeing Iran, Jamileh continued her career in Los Angeles, California, where she settled down. She performed frequently at the Cabaret Tehran in Los Angeles for more than 20 years and through her fifties.

Legacy 
Although dancers like Mahvash and Afat first introduced the belly dance and other Persian folk dances in Iranian cinema, Jamileh was responsible for popularizing a version of the dance in Iran through her performances and film roles. She is a master of Persian dances, including the traditional Bandari and Qasemabadi dances, and some classical Persian dances, and became known for her specific style of the belly dance, as well as Persian dances such as the jâheli dance style. The jâheli style of dance involves imitating a roughneck, jâhel man, and is more overtly erotic compared to more traditional Persian dances. It is often performed wearing a kolâh makhmali, a type of hat similar to a fedora.

According to Ida Meftahi, a historian specializing in modern Iranian history, Jamileh was not associated with the image of a stereotypical cabaret dancer in the media, but the image of "a valuable artist" that was likely improved with the help of her husband's influence.

Filmography 
Jamileh's dancing and acting roles in Iranian cinema include:
 Gohar-e shab-cheragh (The luminescent jewel, 1967)
 Zan-e Vahshi-e Vahshi (The wild, wild woman, 1969)
 Dokhtar-e Zalem Bala (The beautiful tyrant of a girl, 1970)
 Khoshgeltarin Zan-e Alam (1971)
 Aroos-e Paberahneh (The barefoot bride, 1974)
 Sharaf (The honour, 1975)
 Gol Pari Joon (1974)
 Jedal (1976)

See also 
 Persian dance

Citations

Sources

External links 

 
 Video of Jamileh performing the jâheli dance

1946 births
Living people
People from Tehran
Belly dancers
Cabaret performers
Iranian expatriates in the United States
Iranian film actresses
Iranian women dancers
20th-century Iranian women
21st-century Iranian women